Amyl nitrate is the chemical compound with the formula CH3(CH2)4ONO2.  This molecule consists of the 5-carbon amyl group attached to a nitrate functional group.  It is the ester of amyl alcohol and nitric acid.

Applications 
Alkyl nitrates are employed as reagents in organic synthesis.  Amyl nitrate is used as an additive in diesel fuel, where it acts as an "ignition improver" (cetane improver) by accelerating the ignition of fuel.

See also 
 Amyl nitrite – a similarly named chemical used to treat heart diseases and cyanide poisoning
 Poppers (slang term) – a recreational drug based on alkyl nitrite (often confused with amyl nitrate due to similar spelling)

References 

Alkyl nitrates